Sippai ( Soldier) is an upcoming Indian Tamil-language political action film directed by S. Saravanan starring Gautham Karthik and Lakshmi Menon. Producer G V Srinath Raju will produce the film and Yuvan Shankar Raja provides the music. The shooting of the film started on 25 April 2013. Despite the film being completed and a teaser being released in late 2013, the film failed to see a theatrical release.

Cast 
 Gautham Karthik
 Lakshmi Menon
 Ashvin Raja
 Vibha Natarajan
 Madhu
 Shiju

Production 
Director Saravanan said "The film will be an out-and-out commercial youth entertainer set against a college backdrop". Lakshmi Menon of Kumki fame was signed to play the female lead. Tamil actor Madhu, who was lauded for his performance in Tamil film Sundattam, joined the cast Sippai, in which he plays a prominent role. Vibha Natarajan signed the film and said "I play a modern, trendy girl whom I can totally relate to". She joined the team in May and shot at various outdoor locations in Chennai. Saravanan roped in Yuvan Shankar Raja to score the music for the film after teaming up with him in his previous Silambattam as well. A first look teaser was released on YouTube on 10 October 2013.  After eight years of deadlock, the project resumed filming in 2021.

References

External links 
 Sippai at the Internet Movie Database

Unreleased Tamil-language films